This page lists all described genera and species of the spider family Theraphosidae. , the World Spider Catalog accepts 1041 species in 156 genera:

A

Acanthopelma

Acanthopelma F. O. Pickard-Cambridge, 1897
 Acanthopelma beccarii Caporiacco, 1947 - Guyana
 Acanthopelma rufescens F. O. Pickard-Cambridge, 1897 (type) - Central America

Acanthoscurria

Acanthoscurria Ausserer, 1871
 Acanthoscurria belterrensis Paula, Gabriel, Indicatti, Brescovit & Lucas, 2014 - Brazil
 Acanthoscurria chacoana Brèthes, 1909 - Brazil, Bolivia, Paraguay, Argentina
 Acanthoscurria cordubensis Thorell, 1894 - Argentina
 Acanthoscurria geniculata (C. L. Koch, 1841) (type) - Brazil
 Acanthoscurria gomesiana Mello-Leitão, 1923 - Brazil
 Acanthoscurria insubtilis Simon, 1892 - Bolivia, Brazil
 Acanthoscurria juruenicola Mello-Leitão, 1923 - Brazil
 Acanthoscurria maga Simon, 1892 - South America
 Acanthoscurria musculosa Simon, 1892 - Bolivia
 Acanthoscurria natalensis Chamberlin, 1917 - Brazil
 Acanthoscurria paulensis Mello-Leitão, 1923 - Brazil
 Acanthoscurria rhodothele Mello-Leitão, 1923 - Brazil
 Acanthoscurria sacsayhuaman Ferretti, Ochoa & Chaparro, 2016 - Peru
 Acanthoscurria simoensi Vol, 2000 - French Guiana, Brazil
 Acanthoscurria tarda Pocock, 1903 - Brazil
 Acanthoscurria theraphosoides (Doleschall, 1871) - Peru, Bolivia, Brazil, French Guiana
 Acanthoscurria turumban Rodríguez-Manzanilla & Bertani, 2010 - Venezuela
 Acanthoscurria urens Vellard, 1924 - Brazil

Acentropelma

Acentropelma Pocock, 1901
 Acentropelma gutzkei (Reichling, 1997) - Belize
 Acentropelma spinulosum (F. O. Pickard-Cambridge, 1897) (type) - Guatemala

Aenigmarachne

Aenigmarachne Schmidt, 2005
 Aenigmarachne sinapophysis Schmidt, 2005 (type) - Costa Rica

Agnostopelma

Agnostopelma Pérez-Miles & Weinmann, 2010
 Agnostopelma gardel Pérez-Miles & Weinmann, 2010 - Colombia
 Agnostopelma tota Pérez-Miles & Weinmann, 2010 (type) - Colombia

Aguapanela

Aguapanela Perafán & Cifuentes, 2015
 Aguapanela arvi Perafán, Cifuentes & Estrada, 2015 (type) - Colombia

Amazonius 
Amazonius Cifuentes & Bertani, 2022
 
 Amazonius burgessi (Hüsser, 2018) - Venezuela, Colombia, Peru   
 Amazonius elenae (Schmidt, 1994) - Ecuador, Brazil
 Amazonius germani Cifuentes & Bertani, 2022 - French Guiana, Brazil 
 Amazonius giovaninii Cifuentes & Bertani, 2022 - Brazil

Annandaliella

 
Annandaliella Hirst, 1909
 Annandaliella ernakulamensis Sunil Jose & Sebastian, 2008 - India
 Annandaliella pectinifera Gravely, 1935 - India
 Annandaliella travancorica Hirst, 1909 (type) - India

Anoploscelus

Anoploscelus Pocock, 1897
 Anoploscelus celeripes Pocock, 1897 (type) - Uganda, Tanzania
 Anoploscelus lesserti Laurent, 1946 - Rwanda

Anqasha 
Anqasha Sherwood & Gabriel, 2022
 
 Anqasha picta (Pocock, 1903) - Peru

Antikuna 
Antikuna Kaderka, Ferretti, West, Lüddecke & Hüsser, 2021
 
 Antikuna cernickai Kaderka, Ferretti & Lüddecke, 2021 - Peru
 Antikuna cimrmani Kaderka, Ferretti & Hüsser, 2021 - Peru
 Antikuna cyanofemur Kaderka, Ferretti & Hüsser, 2021 - Peru
 Antikuna majkusi Kaderka, Ferretti & Lüddecke, 2021 - Peru
 Antikuna sapallanga Kaderka, Ferretti & Lüddecke, 2021 - Peru
 Antikuna urayrumi Ferretti, Kaderka & West, 2021 - Peru
 Antikuna valladaresi Ferretti, Kaderka & West, 2021 - Peru

Antillena

Antillena Bertani, Huff & Fukushima, 2017
 Antillena rickwesti (Bertani & Huff, 2013) - Dominican Rep.

Aphonopelma

Aphonopelma anax (Chamberlin, 1940) – United States, Mexico
Aphonopelma armada (Chamberlin, 1940) – United States
Aphonopelma atomicum Hamilton, 2016 – United States
Aphonopelma bacadehuachi Hendrixson, 2019 – Mexico
Aphonopelma belindae Gabriel, 2011 – Panama
Aphonopelma bicoloratum Struchen, Brändle & Schmidt, 1996 – Mexico
Aphonopelma burica Valerio, 1980 – Costa Rica
Aphonopelma caniceps (Simon, 1891) – Mexico
Aphonopelma catalina Hamilton, Hendrixson & Bond, 2016 – United States
Aphonopelma chalcodes Chamberlin, 1940 – United States
Aphonopelma chiricahua Hamilton, Hendrixson & Bond, 2016 – United States
Aphonopelma cookei Smith, 1995 – Mexico
Aphonopelma crinirufum (Valerio, 1980) – Costa Rica
Aphonopelma eustathes (Chamberlin, 1940) – Mexico
Aphonopelma eutylenum Chamberlin, 1940 – United States
Aphonopelma gabeli Smith, 1995 – United States
Aphonopelma geotoma (Chamberlin, 1937) – Mexico
Aphonopelma gertschi Smith, 1995 – Mexico
Aphonopelma griseum Chamberlin, 1940 – Mexico
Aphonopelma hageni (Strand, 1906) – Mexico
Aphonopelma helluo (Simon, 1891) – Mexico
Aphonopelma hentzi (Girard, 1852) – United States
Aphonopelma hesperum (Chamberlin, 1917) – Mexico
Aphonopelma icenoglei Hamilton, Hendrixson & Bond, 2016 – United States
Aphonopelma iodius (Chamberlin & Ivie, 1939) – United States
Aphonopelma johnnycashi Hamilton, 2016 – United States
Aphonopelma joshua Prentice, 1997 – United States
Aphonopelma levii Smith, 1995 – Mexico
Aphonopelma madera Hamilton, Hendrixson & Bond, 2016 – United States
Aphonopelma mareki Hamilton, Hendrixson & Bond, 2016 – United States
Aphonopelma marxi (Simon, 1891) – United States
Aphonopelma moderatum (Chamberlin & Ivie, 1939) – United States
Aphonopelma moellendorfi Hamilton, 2016 – United States
Aphonopelma mojave Prentice, 1997 – United States
Aphonopelma mooreae Smith, 1995 – Mexico
Aphonopelma nayaritum Chamberlin, 1940 – Mexico
Aphonopelma pallidum (F. O. Pickard-Cambridge, 1897) – Mexico
Aphonopelma paloma Prentice, 1993 – United States
Aphonopelma parvum Hamilton, Hendrixson & Bond, 2016 – United States
Aphonopelma peloncillo Hamilton, Hendrixson & Bond, 2016 – United States
Aphonopelma phasmus Chamberlin, 1940 – United States
Aphonopelma platnicki Smith, 1995 – Mexico
Aphonopelma prenticei Hamilton, Hendrixson & Bond, 2016 – United States
Aphonopelma prosoicum Chamberlin, 1940 – Mexico
Aphonopelma ruedanum Chamberlin, 1940 – Mexico
Aphonopelma saguaro Hamilton, 2016 – United States
Aphonopelma sclerothrix (Valerio, 1980) – Costa Rica
Aphonopelma seemanni (F. O. Pickard-Cambridge, 1897) (type species) – Central America
Aphonopelma steindachneri (Ausserer, 1875) – United States
Aphonopelma superstitionense Hamilton, Hendrixson & Bond, 2016 – United States
Aphonopelma truncatum (F. O. Pickard-Cambridge, 1897) – Mexico
Aphonopelma vorhiesi (Chamberlin & Ivie, 1939) – United States
Aphonopelma xanthochromum (Valerio, 1980) – Costa Rica
Aphonopelma xwalxwal Hamilton, 2016 – United States

Augacephalus

Augacephalus Gallon, 2002
 Augacephalus breyeri (Hewitt, 1919) (type) - South Africa, Mozambique, Eswatini
 Augacephalus ezendami (Gallon, 2001) - Mozambique
 Augacephalus junodi (Simon, 1904) - East, South Africa

Avicularia

Avicularia Lamarck, 1818
 Avicularia avicularia (Linnaeus, 1758) (type) - Venezuela, Guyana, Suriname, French Guiana, Trinidad and Tobago, Brazil, Peru, Bolivia
 Avicularia caei Fukushima & Bertani, 2017 - Brazil
 Avicularia glauca Simon, 1891 - Panama
 Avicularia hirschii Bullmer, Thierer-Lutz & Schmidt, 2006 - Ecuador, Peru, Brazil
 Avicularia juruensis Mello-Leitão, 1923 - Colombia, Ecuador, Peru, Brazil
 Avicularia lynnae Fukushima & Bertani, 2017 - Peru, Ecuador
 Avicularia merianae Fukushima & Bertani, 2017 - Peru
 Avicularia minatrix Pocock, 1903 - Venezuela, Brazil
 Avicularia purpurea Kirk, 1990 - Colombia, Ecuador, Peru
 Avicularia rufa Schiapelli & Gerschman, 1945 - Ecuador, Peru, Bolivia, Brazil
 Avicularia taunayi (Mello-Leitão, 1920) - Brazil
 Avicularia variegata F. O. Pickard-Cambridge, 1896 - Venezuela, Brazil

B

Bacillochilus

Bacillochilus Gallon, 2010
 Bacillochilus xenostridulans Gallon, 2010 (type) - Angola

Batesiella

Batesiella Pocock, 1903
 Batesiella crinita Pocock, 1903 (type) - Cameroon

Birupes

Birupes Gabriel & Sherwood, 2019
 Birupes simoroxigorum Gabriel & Sherwood, 2019 - Malaysia (Borneo)

Bistriopelma

Bistriopelma Kaderka, 2015
 Bistriopelma fabianae Quispe-Colca & Kaderka, 2020 - Peru
 Bistriopelma kiwicha Nicoletta, Chaparro, Mamani, Ochoa, West & Ferretti, 2020 - Peru
 Bistriopelma lamasi Kaderka, 2015 (type) - Peru
 Bistriopelma matuskai Kaderka, 2015 - Peru
 Bistriopelma peyoi Nicoletta, Chaparro, Mamani, Ochoa, West & Ferretti, 2020 - Peru
 Bistriopelma titicaca Kaderka, 2017 - Peru

Bonnetina

Bonnetina Vol, 2000
 Bonnetina alagoni Locht & Medina, 2008 - Mexico
 Bonnetina aviae Estrada-Alvarez & Locht, 2011 - Mexico
 Bonnetina cyaneifemur Vol, 2000 (type) - Mexico
 Bonnetina flammigera Ortiz & Francke, 2017 - Mexico
 Bonnetina hijmenseni Ortiz & Francke, 2017 - Mexico
 Bonnetina hobbit Ortiz & Francke, 2017 - Mexico
 Bonnetina julesvernei Ortiz & Francke, 2017 - Mexico
 Bonnetina malinalli Ortiz & Francke, 2017 - Mexico
 Bonnetina megagyna Ortiz & Francke, 2017 - Mexico
 Bonnetina minax Ortiz & Francke, 2017 - Mexico
 Bonnetina papalutlensis Mendoza, 2012 - Mexico
 Bonnetina tanzeri Schmidt, 2012 - Mexico
 Bonnetina tenuiverpis Ortiz & Francke, 2015 - Mexico
 Bonnetina tindoo Ortiz & Francke, 2017 - Mexicoa
 Bonnetina unam Ortiz & Francke, 2017 - Mexico
 Bonnetina vittata Ortiz & Francke, 2017 - Mexico

Brachionopus

Brachionopus Pocock, 1897
 Brachionopus annulatus Purcell, 1903 - South Africa
 Brachionopus pretoriae Purcell, 1904 - South Africa
 Brachionopus robustus Pocock, 1897 (type) - South Africa
 Brachionopus tristis Purcell, 1903 - South Africa

Brachypelma

Brachypelma Simon, 1891
 Brachypelma albiceps Pocock, 1903 - Mexico
 Brachypelma auratum Schmidt, 1992 - Mexico
 Brachypelma baumgarteni Smith, 1993 - Mexico
 Brachypelma boehmei Schmidt & Klaas, 1993 - Mexico
 Brachypelma emilia (White, 1856) (type) - Mexico
 Brachypelma hamorii Tesmoingt, Cleton & Verdez, 1997 - Mexico
 Brachypelma klaasi (Schmidt & Krause, 1994) - Mexico
 Brachypelma smithi (F. O. Pickard-Cambridge, 1897) - Mexico

Bumba

Bumba Pérez-Miles, Bonaldo & Miglio, 2014
 Bumba cuiaba Lucas, Passanha & Brescovit, 2020 - Brazil
 Bumba horrida (Schmidt, 1994) - Venezuela, Brazil
 Bumba humilis (Vellard, 1924) - Brazil
 Bumba lennoni Pérez-Miles, Bonaldo & Miglio, 2014 - Brazil
 Bumba mineiros Lucas, Passanha & Brescovit, 2020 - Brazil, Paraguay
 Bumba paunaka Ferretti, 2021 - Bolivia 
 Bumba rondonia Lucas, Passanha & Brescovit, 2020 - Brazil
 Bumba tapajos Lucas, Passanha & Brescovit, 2020 - Brazil

C

Cardiopelma

Cardiopelma Vol, 1999
 Cardiopelma mascatum Vol, 1999 (type) - Unknown

Caribena

Caribena Fukushima & Bertani, 2017
 Caribena laeta (C. L. Koch, 1842) (type) - Puerto Rico, Cuba, US Virgin Is.
 Caribena versicolor (Walckenaer, 1837) - Martinique

Catanduba

Catanduba Yamamoto, Lucas & Brescovit, 2012
 Catanduba araguaia Yamamoto, Lucas & Brescovit, 2012 - Brazil
 Catanduba canabrava Yamamoto, Lucas & Brescovit, 2012 - Brazil
 Catanduba flavohirta (Simon, 1889) - Brazil
 Catanduba peruacu Yamamoto, Lucas & Brescovit, 2012 - Brazil
 Catanduba piauiensis Yamamoto, Lucas & Brescovit, 2012 - Brazil
 Catanduba simoni (Soares & Camargo, 1948) - Brazil
 Catanduba tuskae Yamamoto, Lucas & Brescovit, 2012 (type) - Brazil

Catumiri

Catumiri Guadanucci, 2004
 Catumiri argentinense (Mello-Leitão, 1941) - Chile, Argentina
 Catumiri chicaoi Guadanucci, 2004 - Brazil
 Catumiri parvum (Keyserling, 1878) - Brazil, Uruguay
 Catumiri petropolium Guadanucci, 2004 (type) - Brazil
 Catumiri sapucai (Nicoletta, Panchuk, Peralta-Seen & Ferretti, 2022) – Argentina

Ceratogyrus

Ceratogyrus Pocock, 1897
 Ceratogyrus attonitifer Engelbrecht, 2019 - Angola
 Ceratogyrus brachycephalus Hewitt, 1919 - Botswana, Zimbabwe, South Africa
 Ceratogyrus darlingi Pocock, 1897 (type) - Southern Africa
 Ceratogyrus dolichocephalus Hewitt, 1919 - Zimbabwe
 Ceratogyrus hillyardi (Smith, 1990) - Malawi
 Ceratogyrus marshalli Pocock, 1897 - Zimbabwe, Mozambique
 Ceratogyrus meridionalis (Hirst, 1907) - Malawi, Mozambique
 Ceratogyrus paulseni Gallon, 2005 - South Africa
 Ceratogyrus pillansi (Purcell, 1902) - Zimbabwe, Mozambique
 Ceratogyrus sanderi Strand, 1906 - Namibia, Zimbabwe

Chaetopelma

Chaetopelma Ausserer, 1871
 Chaetopelma altugkadirorum Gallon, Gabriel & Tansley, 2012 - Turkey, Syria
 Chaetopelma concolor (Simon, 1873) - Turkey, Syria, Egypt
 Chaetopelma karlamani Vollmer, 1997 - Cyprus
 Chaetopelma lymberakisi Chatzaki & Komnenov, 2019 - Greece (Crete)
 Chaetopelma olivaceum (C. L. Koch, 1841) (type) - Cyprus, Turkey, Sudan, Egypt, Middle East
 Chaetopelma turkesi Topçu & Demircan, 2014 - Turkey
 Chaetopelma webborum Smith, 1990 - Cameroon

Chilobrachys

Chilobrachys Karsch, 1892
 Chilobrachys andersoni (Pocock, 1895) - India, Myanmar, Malaysia
 Chilobrachys annandalei Simon, 1901 - Malaysia
 Chilobrachys assamensis Hirst, 1909 - India
 Chilobrachys bicolor (Pocock, 1895) - Myanmar
 Chilobrachys brevipes (Thorell, 1897) - Myanmar
 Chilobrachys dominus Lin & Li, 2022 - China
 Chilobrachys dyscolus (Simon, 1886) - Vietnam
 Chilobrachys femoralis Pocock, 1900 - India
 Chilobrachys fimbriatus Pocock, 1899 - India
 Chilobrachys flavopilosus (Simon, 1884) - India, Myanmar
 Chilobrachys fumosus (Pocock, 1895) - India
 Chilobrachys guangxiensis (Yin & Tan, 2000) - China
 Chilobrachys hardwickei (Pocock, 1895) - India
 Chilobrachys himalayensis (Tikader, 1977) - India
 Chilobrachys huahini Schmidt & Huber, 1996 - Thailand
 Chilobrachys hubei Song & Zhao, 1988 - China
 Chilobrachys jinchengi Lin & Li, 2022 - China
 Chilobrachys jonitriantisvansickleae Nanayakkara, Sumanapala & Kirk, 2019 - Sri Lanka
 Chilobrachys khasiensis (Tikader, 1977) - India
 Chilobrachys liboensis Zhu & Zhang, 2008 - China
 Chilobrachys lubricus Yu, S. Y. Zhang, F. Zhang, Li & Yang, 2021 - China
 Chilobrachys nitelinus Karsch, 1892 (type) - Sri Lanka
 Chilobrachys oculatus (Thorell, 1895) - Myanmar
 Chilobrachys paviei (Simon, 1886) - Thailand
 Chilobrachys pococki (Thorell, 1897) - Myanmar
 Chilobrachys sericeus (Thorell, 1895) - Myanmar
 Chilobrachys soricinus (Thorell, 1887) - Myanmar
 Chilobrachys stridulans (Wood Mason, 1877) - India
 Chilobrachys subarmatus (Thorell, 1891) - India (Nicobar Is.)
 Chilobrachys thorelli Pocock, 1900 - India

Chromatopelma

Chromatopelma Schmidt, 1995
 Chromatopelma cyaneopubescens (Strand, 1907) (type) - Venezuela

Citharacanthus

Citharacanthus Pocock, 1901
 Citharacanthus alayoni Rudloff, 1995 - Cuba
 Citharacanthus cyaneus (Rudloff, 1994) - Cuba
 Citharacanthus livingstoni Schmidt & Weinmann, 1996 - Guatemala
 Citharacanthus longipes (F. O. Pickard-Cambridge, 1897) (type) - Mexico, Central America
 Citharacanthus meermani Reichling & West, 2000 - Belize, Mexico
 Citharacanthus niger Franganillo, 1931 - Cuba
 Citharacanthus sargi (Strand, 1907) - Guatemala
 Citharacanthus spinicrus (Latreille, 1819) - Cuba, Hispaniola

Citharognathus

Citharognathus Pocock, 1895
 Citharognathus hosei Pocock, 1895 (type) - Borneo
 Citharognathus tongmianensis Zhu, Li & Song, 2002 - China

Clavopelma

Clavopelma Chamberlin, 1940
 Clavopelma tamaulipeca (Chamberlin, 1937) (type) - Mexico

Coremiocnemis

Coremiocnemis Simon, 1892
 Coremiocnemis cunicularia (Simon, 1892) (type) - Malaysia
 Coremiocnemis hoggi West & Nunn, 2010 - Malaysia
 Coremiocnemis kotacana West & Nunn, 2010 - Indonesia (Sumatra)
 Coremiocnemis obscura West & Nunn, 2010 - Malaysia
 Coremiocnemis tropix Raven, 2005 - Australia (Queensland)
 Coremiocnemis valida Pocock, 1895 - Borneo

Cotztetlana

Cotztetlana Mendoza, 2012
 Cotztetlana omiltemi Mendoza, 2012 (type) - Mexico
 Cotztetlana villadai Estrada-Alvarez, 2014 - Mexico

Crassicrus

Crassicrus Reichling & West, 1996
 Crassicrus bidxigui Candia-Ramírez & Francke, 2017 - Mexico
 Crassicrus cocona Candia-Ramírez & Francke, 2017 - Mexico
 Crassicrus lamanai Reichling & West, 1996 (type) - Belize
 Crassicrus stoicum (Chamberlin, 1925) - Mexico
 Crassicrus tochtli Candia-Ramírez & Francke, 2017 - Mexico
 Crassicrus yumkimil Candia-Ramírez & Francke, 2017 - Mexico

Cubanana

Cubanana Ortiz, 2008
 Cubanana cristinae Ortiz, 2008 (type) - Cuba

Cyclosternum

Cyclosternum Ausserer, 1871
 Cyclosternum darienense Gabriel & Sherwood, 2022 - Panama 
 Cyclosternum familiare (Simon, 1889) - Venezuela
 Cyclosternum garbei (Mello-Leitão, 1923) - Brazil
 Cyclosternum gaujoni Simon, 1889 - Ecuador
 Cyclosternum janthinum (Simon, 1889) - Ecuador
 Cyclosternum kochi (Ausserer, 1871) - Venezuela
 Cyclosternum ledezmae (Vol, 2001) - Bolivia
 Cyclosternum palomeranum West, 2000 - Mexico
 Cyclosternum rufohirtum (Simon, 1889) - Venezuela
 Cyclosternum schmardae Ausserer, 1871 (type) - Colombia, Ecuador
 Cyclosternum spinopalpus (Schaefer, 1996) - Paraguay
 Cyclosternum viridimonte Valerio, 1982 - Costa Rica

Cymbiapophysa 
Cymbiapophysa Gabriel & Sherwood, 2020 
 
 Cymbiapophysa magna Sherwood, Gabriel, Brescovit & Lucas, 2021 - Colombia
 Cymbiapophysa marimbai (Perafán & Valencia-Cuéllar, 2018) - Colombia
 Cymbiapophysa velox (Pocock, 1903) - Ecudar
 Cymbiapophysa yimana Gabriel & Sherwood, 2020 - Peru or Ecuador

Cyriocosmus

Cyriocosmus Simon, 1903
 Cyriocosmus aueri Kaderka, 2016 - Peru
 Cyriocosmus bertae Pérez-Miles, 1998 - Brazil
 Cyriocosmus bicolor (Schiapelli & Gerschman, 1945) - Brazil
 Cyriocosmus blenginii Pérez-Miles, 1998 - Bolivia
 Cyriocosmus elegans (Simon, 1889) - Venezuela, Trinidad and Tobago
 Cyriocosmus fasciatus (Mello-Leitão, 1930) - Brazil
 Cyriocosmus fernandoi Fukushima, Bertani & da Silva, 2005 - Brazil
 Cyriocosmus foliatus Kaderka, 2019 - Peru
 Cyriocosmus giganteus Kaderka, 2016 - Peru
 Cyriocosmus hoeferi Kaderka, 2016 - Brazil
 Cyriocosmus itayensis Kaderka, 2016 - Peru
 Cyriocosmus leetzi Vol, 1999 - Colombia, Venezuela
 Cyriocosmus nicholausgordoni Kaderka, 2016 - Venezuela
 Cyriocosmus nogueiranetoi Fukushima, Bertani & da Silva, 2005 - Brazil
 Cyriocosmus paredesi Kaderka, 2019 - Peru
 Cyriocosmus perezmilesi Kaderka, 2007 - Bolivia
 Cyriocosmus peruvianus Kaderka, 2016 - Peru
 Cyriocosmus pribiki Pérez-Miles & Weinmann, 2009 - Peru
 Cyriocosmus ritae Pérez-Miles, 1998 - Peru, Brazil
 Cyriocosmus sellatus (Simon, 1889) (type) - Peru, Brazil
 Cyriocosmus venezuelensis Kaderka, 2010 - Venezuela
 Cyriocosmus versicolor (Simon, 1897) - Paraguay, Argentina
 Cyriocosmus williamlamari Kaderka, 2016 - Venezuela

Cyriopagopus

Cyriopagopus Simon, 1887
 Cyriopagopus albostriatus (Simon, 1886) - Myanmar, Thailand, Cambodia
 Cyriopagopus doriae (Thorell, 1890) - Malaysia (Borneo)
 Cyriopagopus hainanus (Liang, Peng, Huang & Chen, 1999) - China
 Cyriopagopus lividus (Smith, 1996) - Myanmar, Thailand
 Cyriopagopus longipes (von Wirth & Striffler, 2005) - Thailand, Cambodia, Laos
 Cyriopagopus minax (Thorell, 1897) - Myanmar, Thailand
 Cyriopagopus paganus Simon, 1887 (type) - Myanmar
 Cyriopagopus schmidti (von Wirth, 1991) - China, Vietnam
 Cyriopagopus vonwirthi (Schmidt, 2005) - Southeast Asia

Cyrtogrammomma 
Cyrtogrammomma Pocock, 1895
 
 Cyrtogrammomma frevo Gonzalez-Filho, Fonseca-Ferreira, Brescovit & Guadanucci, 2022 - Brazil
 Cyrtogrammomma monticola Pocock, 1895 - Guyana, Brazil 
 Cyrtogrammomma raveni Mori & Bertani, 2020 - Guyana

Cyrtopholis

Cyrtopholis Simon, 1892
 Cyrtopholis agilis Pocock, 1903 - Hispaniola
 Cyrtopholis anacanta Franganillo, 1935 - Cuba
 Cyrtopholis annectans Chamberlin, 1917 - Barbados
 Cyrtopholis bartholomaei (Latreille, 1832) - St. Thomas, Antigua
 Cyrtopholis bonhotei (F. O. Pickard-Cambridge, 1901) - Bahama Is.
 Cyrtopholis bryantae Rudloff, 1995 - Cuba
 Cyrtopholis culebrae (Petrunkevitch, 1929) - Puerto Rico
 Cyrtopholis cursor (Ausserer, 1875) (type) - Hispaniola
 Cyrtopholis femoralis Pocock, 1903 - Montserrat
 Cyrtopholis flavostriata Schmidt, 1995 - Virgin Is.
 Cyrtopholis gibbosa Franganillo, 1936 - Cuba
 Cyrtopholis innocua (Ausserer, 1871) - Cuba
 Cyrtopholis intermedia (Ausserer, 1875) - South America
 Cyrtopholis ischnoculiformis (Franganillo, 1926) - Cuba
 Cyrtopholis jamaicola Strand, 1908 - Jamaica
 Cyrtopholis major (Franganillo, 1926) - Cuba
 Cyrtopholis obsoleta (Franganillo, 1935) - Cuba
 Cyrtopholis plumosa Franganillo, 1931 - Cuba
 Cyrtopholis portoricae Chamberlin, 1917 - Puerto Rico
 Cyrtopholis ramsi Rudloff, 1995 - Cuba
 Cyrtopholis regibbosa Rudloff, 1994 - Cuba
 Cyrtopholis unispina Franganillo, 1926 - Cuba

D

Davus

Davus O. Pickard-Cambridge, 1892
 Davus fasciatus O. Pickard-Cambridge, 1892 (type) - Costa Rica, Panama
 Davus pentaloris (Simon, 1888) - Mexico, Guatemala
 Davus ruficeps (Simon, 1891) - Costa Rica, Nicaragua
 Davus santos Gabriel, 2016 - Panama

Dolichothele

Dolichothele Mello-Leitão, 1923
 Dolichothele auratum (Vellard, 1924) - Brazil
 Dolichothele bolivianum (Vol, 2001) - Bolivia, Brazil
 Dolichothele camargorum Revollo, da Silva & Bertani, 2017 - Bolivia, Brazil
 Dolichothele diamantinensis (Bertani, Santos & Righi, 2009) - Brazil
 Dolichothele dominguense (Guadanucci, 2007) - Brazil
 Dolichothele exilis Mello-Leitão, 1923 (type) - Brazil
 Dolichothele mineirum (Guadanucci, 2011) - Brazil
 Dolichothele mottai Revollo, da Silva & Bertani, 2017 - Brazil
 Dolichothele rufoniger (Guadanucci, 2007) - Brazil
 Dolichothele tucuruiense (Guadanucci, 2007) - Brazil

E

Encyocratella

Encyocratella Strand, 1907
 Encyocratella olivacea Strand, 1907 (type) - Tanzania

Encyocrates

Encyocrates Simon, 1892
 Encyocrates raffrayi Simon, 1892 (type) - Madagascar

Ephebopus

Ephebopus Simon, 1892
 Ephebopus cyanognathus West & Marshall, 2000 - French Guiana
 Ephebopus foliatus West, Marshall, Fukushima & Bertani, 2008 - Guyana
 Ephebopus murinus (Walckenaer, 1837) (type) - French Guiana, Suriname, Brazil
 Ephebopus rufescens West & Marshall, 2000 - French Guiana, Brazil
 Ephebopus uatuman Lucas, Silva & Bertani, 1992 - Brazil

Euathlus

Euathlus Ausserer, 1875
 Euathlus affinis (Nicolet, 1849) - Chile
 Euathlus antai Perafán & Pérez-Miles, 2014 - Chile
 Euathlus atacama Perafán & Pérez-Miles, 2014 - Chile
 Euathlus condorito Perafán & Pérez-Miles, 2014 - Chile
 Euathlus diamante Ferretti, 2015 - Argentina
 Euathlus grismadoi Ríos-Tamayo, 2020 - Argentina
 Euathlus manicata (Simon, 1892) - Chile
 Euathlus mauryi Ríos-Tamayo, 2020 - Argentina
 Euathlus pampa Ríos-Tamayo, 2020 - Argentina 
 Euathlus parvulus (Pocock, 1903) - Chile
 Euathlus sagei Ferretti, 2015 - Argentina
 Euathlus tenebrarum Ferretti, 2015 - Argentina
 Euathlus truculentus L. Koch, 1875 (type) - Chile, Argentina
 Euathlus vanessae Quispe-Colca & Ferretti, 2021 - Peru

Eucratoscelus

Eucratoscelus Pocock, 1898
 Eucratoscelus constrictus (Gerstäcker, 1873) (type) - Kenya, Tanzania
 Eucratoscelus pachypus Schmidt & von Wirth, 1990 - Tanzania

Eumenophorus

Eumenophorus Pocock, 1897
 Eumenophorus clementsi Pocock, 1897 (type) - Sierra Leone
 Eumenophorus murphyorum Smith, 1990 - Sierra Leone

Eupalaestrus

Eupalaestrus Pocock, 1901
 Eupalaestrus campestratus (Simon, 1891) (type) - Brazil, Paraguay, Argentina
 Eupalaestrus crassimetatarsis Borges, Paladini & Bertani, 2021 - Brazil, Argentina
 Eupalaestrus larae Ferretti & Barneche, 2012 - Argentina
 Eupalaestrus roccoi Borges, Paladini & Bertani, 2021 - Brazil
 Eupalaestrus spinosissimus Mello-Leitão, 1923 - Brazil
 Eupalaestrus weijenberghi (Thorell, 1894) - Brazil, Uruguay, Argentina

Euphrictus

Euphrictus Hirst, 1908
 Euphrictus spinosus Hirst, 1908 (type) - Cameroon
 Euphrictus squamosus (Benoit, 1965) - Congo

Euthycaelus

Euthycaelus Simon, 1889
 Euthycaelus amandae Guadanucci & Weinmann, 2014 - Colombia
 Euthycaelus astutus (Simon, 1889) - Venezuela
 Euthycaelus colonica Simon, 1889 (type) - Venezuela
 Euthycaelus guane Valencia-Cuellar, Perafán & Guadanucci, 2019 - Colombia
 Euthycaelus norae Guadanucci & Weinmann, 2014 - Colombia, Venezuela
 Euthycaelus quinteroi Gabriel & Sherwood, 2022 - Panama

G

Grammostola

Grammostola Simon, 1892
 Grammostola actaeon (Pocock, 1903) - Brazil, Uruguay
 Grammostola alticeps (Pocock, 1903) - Uruguay
 Grammostola andreleetzi Vol, 2008 - Uruguay
 Grammostola anthracina (C. L. Koch, 1842) - Brazil, Uruguay, Paraguay, Argentina
 Grammostola borelli (Simon, 1897) - Paraguay
 Grammostola burzaquensis Ibarra, 1946 - Argentina
 Grammostola chalcothrix Chamberlin, 1917 - Argentina
 Grammostola diminuta Ferretti, Pompozzi, González & Pérez-Miles, 2013 - Argentina
 Grammostola doeringi (Holmberg, 1881) - Argentina
 Grammostola gossei (Pocock, 1899) - Argentina
 Grammostola grossa (Ausserer, 1871) - Brazil, Paraguay, Uruguay, Argentina
 Grammostola iheringi (Keyserling, 1891) - Brazil
 Grammostola inermis Mello-Leitão, 1941 - Argentina
 Grammostola mendozae (Strand, 1907) - Argentina
 Grammostola pulchra Mello-Leitão, 1921 - Brazil
 Grammostola pulchripes (Simon, 1891) (type) - Paraguay, Argentina
 Grammostola quirogai Montes de Oca, D'Elía & Pérez-Miles, 2016 - Brazil, Uruguay
 Grammostola rosea (Walckenaer, 1837) - Bolivia, Chile, Argentina
 Grammostola subvulpina (Strand, 1906) - South America
 Grammostola vachoni Schiapelli & Gerschman, 1961 - Argentina

Guyruita

Guyruita Guadanucci, Lucas, Indicatti & Yamamoto, 2007
 Guyruita atlantica Guadanucci, Lucas, Indicatti & Yamamoto, 2007 - Brazil
 Guyruita cerrado Guadanucci, Lucas, Indicatti & Yamamoto, 2007 (type) - Brazil
 Guyruita giupponii Fukushima & Bertani, 2018 - Brazil
 Guyruita guadanuccii Sherwood & Gabriel, 2021 -French Guiana
 Guyruita isae Fukushima & Bertani, 2018 - Brazil
 Guyruita metallophila Fonseca-Ferreira, Zampaulo & Guadanucci, 2017 - Brazil

H

Hapalopus

Hapalopus Ausserer, 1875
 Hapalopus aymara Perdomo, Panzera & Pérez-Miles, 2009 - Bolivia, Brazil
 Hapalopus butantan (Pérez-Miles, 1998) - Brazil
 Hapalopus coloratus (Valerio, 1982) - Panama
 Hapalopus formosus Ausserer, 1875 (type) - Colombia
 Hapalopus gasci (Maréchal, 1996) - French Guiana 
 Hapalopus lesleyae Gabriel, 2011 - Guyana
 Hapalopus nigriventris (Mello-Leitão, 1939) - Venezuela
 Hapalopus serrapelada Fonseca-Ferreira, Zampaulo & Guadanucci, 2017 - Brazil
 Hapalopus triseriatus Caporiacco, 1955 - Venezuela
 Hapalopus variegatus (Caporiacco, 1955) - Venezuela

Hapalotremus

Hapalotremus Simon, 1903
 Hapalotremus albipes Simon, 1903 (type) - Bolivia
 Hapalotremus apasanka Sherwood, Ferretti, Gabriel & West, 2021 - Peru
 Hapalotremus carabaya Ferretti, Cavalllo, Chaparro, Ríos-Tamayo, Seimon & West, 2018 - Peru
 Hapalotremus chasqui Ferretti, Cavalllo, Chaparro, Ríos-Tamayo, Seimon & West, 2018 - Argentina
 Hapalotremus chespiritoi Ferretti, Cavalllo, Chaparro, Ríos-Tamayo, Seimon & West, 2018 - Peru
 Hapalotremus hananqheswa Sherwood, Ferretti, Gabriel & West, 2021 - Peru
 Hapalotremus kaderkai Sherwood, Ferretti, Gabriel & West, 2021 - Peru
 Hapalotremus kuka Ferretti, Cavalllo, Chaparro, Ríos-Tamayo, Seimon & West, 2018 - Bolivia
 Hapalotremus major (Chamberlin, 1916) - Peru
 Hapalotremus marcapata Ferretti, Cavalllo, Chaparro, Ríos-Tamayo, Seimon & West, 2018 - Peru
 Hapalotremus martinorum Cavallo & Ferretti, 2015 - Argentina
 Hapalotremus perezmilesi Ferretti, Cavalllo, Chaparro, Ríos-Tamayo, Seimon & West, 2018 - Peru
 Hapalotremus vilcanota Ferretti, Cavalllo, Chaparro, Ríos-Tamayo, Seimon & West, 2018 - Peru
 Hapalotremus yuraqchanka Sherwood, Ferretti, Gabriel & West, 2021 - Bolivia

Haploclastus

Haploclastus Simon, 1892
 Haploclastus cervinus Simon, 1892 (type) - India
 Haploclastus devamatha Prasanth & Sunil Jose, 2014 - India
 Haploclastus kayi Gravely, 1915 - India
 Haploclastus nilgirinus Pocock, 1899 - India
 Haploclastus satyanus (Barman, 1978) - India
 Haploclastus tenebrosus Gravely, 1935 - India
 Haploclastus validus (Pocock, 1899) - India

Haplocosmia

Haplocosmia Schmidt & von Wirth, 1996
 Haplocosmia himalayana (Pocock, 1899) - Himalayas
 Haplocosmia nepalensis Schmidt & von Wirth, 1996 (type) - Nepal
 Haplocosmia sherwoodae Lin & Li, 2022 - China

Harpactira

Harpactira Ausserer, 1871
 Harpactira atra (Latreille, 1832) (type) - South Africa
 Harpactira baviana Purcell, 1903 - South Africa
 Harpactira cafreriana (Walckenaer, 1837) - South Africa
 Harpactira chrysogaster Pocock, 1897 - South Africa
 Harpactira curator Pocock, 1898 - South Africa
 Harpactira curvipes Pocock, 1897 - South Africa
 Harpactira dictator Purcell, 1902 - South Africa
 Harpactira gigas Pocock, 1898 - South Africa
 Harpactira hamiltoni Pocock, 1902 - South Africa
 Harpactira lineata Pocock, 1897 - South Africa
 Harpactira lyrata (Simon, 1892) - South Africa
 Harpactira marksi Purcell, 1902 - South Africa
 Harpactira namaquensis Purcell, 1902 - Namibia, South Africa
 Harpactira pulchripes Pocock, 1901 - South Africa
 Harpactira tigrina Ausserer, 1875 - South Africa

Harpactirella

Harpactirella Purcell, 1902
 Harpactirella domicola Purcell, 1903 - South Africa
 Harpactirella helenae Purcell, 1903 - South Africa
 Harpactirella insidiosa (Denis, 1960) - Morocco
 Harpactirella karrooica Purcell, 1902 - South Africa
 Harpactirella lapidaria Purcell, 1908 - South Africa
 Harpactirella lightfooti Purcell, 1902 - South Africa
 Harpactirella longipes Purcell, 1902 - South Africa
 Harpactirella magna Purcell, 1903 - South Africa
 Harpactirella overdijki Gallon, 2010 - South Africa
 Harpactirella schwarzi Purcell, 1904 - South Africa
 Harpactirella spinosa Purcell, 1908 - South Africa
 Harpactirella treleaveni Purcell, 1902 (type) - South Africa

Hemirrhagus

Hemirrhagus Simon, 1903
 Hemirrhagus akheronteus Mendoza & Francke, 2018 - Mexico
 Hemirrhagus benzaa Mendoza, 2014 - Mexico
 Hemirrhagus billsteelei Mendoza & Francke, 2018 - Mexico
 Hemirrhagus cervinus (Simon, 1891) (type) - Mexico
 Hemirrhagus chilango Pérez-Miles & Locht, 2003 - Mexico
 Hemirrhagus coztic Pérez-Miles & Locht, 2003 - Mexico
 Hemirrhagus diablo Mendoza & Francke, 2018 - Mexico
 Hemirrhagus elliotti (Gertsch, 1973) - Mexico
 Hemirrhagus embolulatus Mendoza, 2014 - Mexico
 Hemirrhagus eros Pérez-Miles & Locht, 2003 - Mexico
 Hemirrhagus franckei Mendoza, 2014 - Mexico
 Hemirrhagus gertschi Pérez-Miles & Locht, 2003 - Mexico
 Hemirrhagus grieta (Gertsch, 1982) - Mexico
 Hemirrhagus guichi Mendoza, 2014 - Mexico
 Hemirrhagus kalebi Mendoza & Francke, 2018 - Mexico
 Hemirrhagus lochti Estrada-Alvarez, 2014 - Mexico
 Hemirrhagus mitchelli (Gertsch, 1982) - Mexico
 Hemirrhagus nahuanus (Gertsch, 1982) - Mexico
 Hemirrhagus ocellatus Pérez-Miles & Locht, 2003 - Mexico
 Hemirrhagus papalotl Pérez-Miles & Locht, 2003 - Mexico
 Hemirrhagus perezmilesi García-Villafuerte & Locht, 2010 - Mexico
 Hemirrhagus pernix (Ausserer, 1875) - Mexico
 Hemirrhagus puebla (Gertsch, 1982) - Mexico
 Hemirrhagus reddelli (Gertsch, 1973) - Mexico
 Hemirrhagus sprousei Mendoza & Francke, 2018 - Mexico
 Hemirrhagus stygius (Gertsch, 1971) - Mexico
 Hemirrhagus valdezi Mendoza, 2014 - Mexico

Heterophrictus

Heterophrictus Pocock, 1900
 Heterophrictus aareyensis Mirza & Sanap, 2014 - India
 Heterophrictus blatteri (Gravely, 1935) - India
 Heterophrictus milleti Pocock, 1900 (type) - India
 Heterophrictus raveni Mirza & Sanap, 2014 - India

Heteroscodra

Heteroscodra Pocock, 1900
 Heteroscodra crassipes Hirst, 1907 - Cameroon, Gabon, Congo
 Heteroscodra maculata Pocock, 1900 (type) - West, Central Africa

Heterothele

Heterothele Karsch, 1879
 Heterothele affinis Laurent, 1946 - Congo, Tanzania
 Heterothele atropha Simon, 1907 - Congo
 Heterothele caudicula (Simon, 1886) - Argentina
 Heterothele darcheni (Benoit, 1966) - Gabon
 Heterothele decemnotata (Simon, 1891) - Congo
 Heterothele gabonensis (Lucas, 1858) - Gabon
 Heterothele honesta Karsch, 1879 (type) - Angola
 Heterothele hullwilliamsi Smith, 1990 - Cameroon
 Heterothele ogbunikia Smith, 1990 - Nigeria
 Heterothele spinipes Pocock, 1897 - Tanzania

Holothele
Holothele Karsch, 1879
 Holothele culebrae (Petrunkevitch, 1929) - Puerto Rico
 Holothele denticulata (Franganillo, 1930) - Cuba
 Holothele longipes (L. Koch, 1875) (type) - Venezuela, Bolivia, Trinidad and Tobago, French Guiana, Suriname, Brazil
 Holothele maddeni (Esposito & Agnarsson, 2014) - Dominican Republic
 Holothele shoemakeri (Petrunkevitch, 1926) - US Virgin Islands (St. Thomas)
 Holothele sulfurensis Maréchal, 2005 - Guadeloupe

Homoeomma

Homoeomma Ausserer, 1871
 Homoeomma brasilianum (Chamberlin, 1917) - Brazil
 Homoeomma chilensis Montenegro & Aguilera, 2018 - Chile
 Homoeomma elegans (Gerschman & Schiapelli, 1958) - Argentina
 Homoeomma familiare Bertkau, 1880 - Brazil
 Homoeomma hirsutum (Mello-Leitão, 1935) - Brazil
 Homoeomma montanum (Mello-Leitão, 1923) - Brazil
 Homoeomma nigrum (Walckenaer, 1837) - Brazil
 Homoeomma orellanai Montenegro & Aguilera, 2018 - Chile
 Homoeomma peruvianum (Chamberlin, 1916) - Peru
 Homoeomma strabo (Simon, 1892) - Colombia, Brazil
 Homoeomma stradlingi O. Pickard-Cambridge, 1881 (type) - Brazil
 Homoeomma uruguayense (Mello-Leitão, 1946) - Uruguay, Argentina
 Homoeomma villosum (Keyserling, 1891) - Brazil

Hysterocrates

Hysterocrates Simon, 1892
 Hysterocrates apostolicus Pocock, 1900 - São Tomé and Príncipe
 Hysterocrates celerierae (Smith, 1990) - Ivory Coast
 Hysterocrates crassipes Pocock, 1897 - Cameroon
 Hysterocrates didymus Pocock, 1900 - São Tomé and Príncipe
 Hysterocrates ederi Charpentier, 1995 - Equatorial Guinea (Bioko)
 Hysterocrates efuliensis (Smith, 1990) - Cameroon
 Hysterocrates elephantiasis (Berland, 1917) - Congo
 Hysterocrates gigas Pocock, 1897 - Cameroon
 Hysterocrates greeffi (Karsch, 1884) - Cameroon
 Hysterocrates greshoffi (Simon, 1891) (type) - Congo
 Hysterocrates hercules Pocock, 1900 - Nigeria
 Hysterocrates laticeps Pocock, 1897 - Cameroon
 Hysterocrates maximus Strand, 1906 - Cameroon
 Hysterocrates ochraceus Strand, 1907 - Cameroon, Congo
 Hysterocrates robustus Pocock, 1900 - Equatorial Guinea (Mbini)
 Hysterocrates robustus sulcifer Strand, 1908 - Cameroon
 Hysterocrates scepticus Pocock, 1900 - São Tomé and Príncipe
 Hysterocrates sjostedti (Thorell, 1899) - Cameroon
 Hysterocrates weileri Strand, 1906 - Cameroon

I

Idiothele

Idiothele Hewitt, 1919
 Idiothele mira Gallon, 2010 - South Africa
 Idiothele nigrofulva (Pocock, 1898) (type) - Southern Africa

Iridopelma

Iridopelma Pocock, 1901
 Iridopelma hirsutum Pocock, 1901 (type) - Brazil
 Iridopelma katiae Bertani, 2012 - Brazil
 Iridopelma marcoi Bertani, 2012 - Brazil
 Iridopelma oliveirai Bertani, 2012 - Brazil
 Iridopelma vanini Bertani, 2012 - Brazil
 Iridopelma zorodes (Mello-Leitão, 1926) - Brazil

Ischnocolus

Ischnocolus Ausserer, 1871
 Ischnocolus elongatus (Simon, 1873) - Morocco, Algeria
 Ischnocolus hancocki Smith, 1990 - Morocco
 Ischnocolus ignoratus Guadanucci & Wendt, 2014 - Israel, Syria?
 Ischnocolus jickelii L. Koch, 1875 - Djibouti, Ethiopia, Somalia, Yemen
 Ischnocolus rubropilosus Keyserling, 1891 - Brazil
 Ischnocolus tomentosus Thorell, 1899 - Cameroon, Congo
 Ischnocolus valentinus (Dufour, 1820) (type) - Spain, Italy (Sicily), Morocco, Algeria, Tunesia, Libya
 Ischnocolus vanandelae Montemor, West & Zamani, 2020 - Oman, Iran

K

Kankuamo

Kankuamo Perafán, Galvis & Pérez-Miles, 2016
 Kankuamo marquezi Perafán, Galvis & Gutiérrez, 2016 (type) - Colombia

Kochiana

Kochiana Fukushima, Nagahama & Bertani, 2008
 Kochiana brunnipes (C. L. Koch, 1842) (type) - Brazil

L

Lampropelma
Lampropelma Simon, 1892
 Lampropelma carpenteri (Smith & Jacobi, 2015) - Borneo, Indonesia
 Lampropelma nigerrimum Simon, 1892 (type) - Indonesia

Lasiodora

Lasiodora C. L. Koch, 1850
 Lasiodora acanthognatha Mello-Leitão, 1921 - Brazil
 Lasiodora benedeni Bertkau, 1880 - Brazil
 Lasiodora boliviana (Simon, 1892) - Bolivia
 Lasiodora brevibulba (Valerio, 1980) - Costa Rica
 Lasiodora carinata (Valerio, 1980) - Costa Rica
 Lasiodora citharacantha Mello-Leitão, 1921 - Brazil
 Lasiodora cristata (Mello-Leitão, 1923) - Brazil
 Lasiodora cryptostigma Mello-Leitão, 1921 - Brazil
 Lasiodora curtior Chamberlin, 1917 - Brazil
 Lasiodora differens Chamberlin, 1917 - Brazil
 Lasiodora difficilis Mello-Leitão, 1921 - Brazil
 Lasiodora dolichosterna Mello-Leitão, 1921 - Brazil
 Lasiodora dulcicola Mello-Leitão, 1921 - Brazil
 Lasiodora erythrocythara Mello-Leitão, 1921 - Brazil
 Lasiodora fallax (Bertkau, 1880) - Brazil
 Lasiodora fracta Mello-Leitão, 1921 - Brazil
 Lasiodora icecu (Valerio, 1980) - Costa Rica
 Lasiodora isabellina (Ausserer, 1871) - Brazil
 Lasiodora itabunae Mello-Leitão, 1921 - Brazil
 Lasiodora klugi (C. L. Koch, 1841) (type) - Brazil
 Lasiodora lakoi Mello-Leitão, 1943 - Brazil
 Lasiodora mariannae Mello-Leitão, 1921 - Brazil
 Lasiodora moreni (Holmberg, 1876) - Argentina
 Lasiodora pantherina (Keyserling, 1891) - Brazil
 Lasiodora parahybana Mello-Leitão, 1917 - Brazil
 Lasiodora pleoplectra Mello-Leitão, 1921 - Brazil
 Lasiodora puriscal (Valerio, 1980) - Costa Rica
 Lasiodora rubitarsa (Valerio, 1980) - Costa Rica
 Lasiodora saeva (Walckenaer, 1837) - Uruguay
 Lasiodora spinipes Ausserer, 1871 - Brazil
 Lasiodora sternalis (Mello-Leitão, 1923) - Brazil
 Lasiodora striatipes (Ausserer, 1871) - Brazil
 Lasiodora subcanens Mello-Leitão, 1921 - Brazil

Lasiodorides

Lasiodorides Schmidt & Bischoff, 1997
 Lasiodorides polycuspulatus Schmidt & Bischoff, 1997 (type) - Peru
 Lasiodorides striatus (Schmidt & Antonelli, 1996) - Peru

Longilyra

Longilyra Gabriel, 2014
 Longilyra johnlonghorni Gabriel, 2014 (type) - El Salvador

Loxomphalia

Loxomphalia Simon, 1889
 Loxomphalia rubida Simon, 1889 (type) - Tanzania (Zanzibar)

Loxoptygus

Loxoptygus Simon, 1903
 Loxoptygus coturnatus Simon, 1903 - Ethiopia
 Loxoptygus ectypus (Simon, 1889) (type) - Ethiopia

Lyrognathus

Lyrognathus Pocock, 1895
 Lyrognathus achilles West & Nunn, 2010 - Borneo
 Lyrognathus crotalus Pocock, 1895 (type) - India
 Lyrognathus fuscus West & Nunn, 2010 - Borneo
 Lyrognathus giannisposatoi Nunn & West, 2013 - Indonesia (Sumatra)
 Lyrognathus lessunda West & Nunn, 2010 - Indonesia (Lombok)
 Lyrognathus robustus Smith, 1988 - Malaysia
 Lyrognathus saltator Pocock, 1900 - India

M

Magnacarina

Magnacarina Mendoza, Locht, Kaderka, Medina & Pérez-Miles, 2016
 Magnacarina aldana (West, 2000) (type) - Mexico
 Magnacarina cancer Mendoza & Locht, 2016 - Mexico
 Magnacarina moderata Locht, Mendoza & Medina, 2016 - Mexico
 Magnacarina primaverensis Mendoza & Locht, 2016 - Mexico

Mascaraneus

Mascaraneus Gallon, 2005
 Mascaraneus remotus Gallon, 2005 (type) - Mauritius

Megaphobema

Megaphobema Pocock, 1901
 Megaphobema mesomelas (O. Pickard-Cambridge, 1892) - Costa Rica
 Megaphobema peterklaasi Schmidt, 1994 - Costa Rica
 Megaphobema robustum (Ausserer, 1875) (type) - Colombia
 Megaphobema teceae Pérez-Miles, Miglio & Bonaldo, 2006 - Brazil
 Megaphobema velvetosoma Schmidt, 1995 - Ecuador

Melloina 
Melloina Brignoli, 1985
 
 Melloina gracilis (Schenkel, 1953) (type) - Venezuela
 Melloina rickwesti Raven, 1999 - Panama
 Melloina santuario Bertani, 2013 - Venezuela

Melognathus 
Melognathus Chamberlin, 1917
 
 Melognathus dromeus Chamberlin, 1917 (type) - Phillipines

Metriopelma

Metriopelma Becker, 1878
 Metriopelma breyeri (Becker, 1878) (type) - Mexico

Miaschistopus

Miaschistopus Pocock, 1897
 Miaschistopus tetricus (Simon, 1889) (type) - Venezuela

Monocentropus

Monocentropus Pocock, 1897
 Monocentropus balfouri Pocock, 1897 (type) - Yemen (Socotra)
 Monocentropus lambertoni Fage, 1922 - Madagascar
 Monocentropus longimanus Pocock, 1903 - Yemen

Munduruku

Munduruku Miglio, Bonaldo & Pérez-Miles, 2013
 Munduruku bicoloratum Miglio, Bonaldo & Pérez-Miles, 2013 (type) - Brazil

Murphyarachne 
Murphyarachne Sherwood & Gabriel, 2022
 
 Murphyarachne ymasumacae Sherwood & Gabriel, 2022 (type) - Peru

Mygalarachne

Mygalarachne Ausserer, 1871
 Mygalarachne brevipes Ausserer, 1871 (type) - Honduras

Myostola

Myostola Simon, 1903
 Myostola occidentalis (Lucas, 1858) (type) - Gabon, Cameroon

N

Neischnocolus

Neischnocolus Petrunkevitch, 1925
 Neischnocolus amazonica (Jimenez & Bertani, 2008) - Colombia
 Neischnocolus armihuariensis (Kaderka, 2014) - Peru
 Neischnocolus caxiuana (Pérez-Miles, Miglio & Bonaldo, 2008) - Brazil
 Neischnocolus iquitos Kaderka, 2020 - Peru
 Neischnocolus obscurus (Ausserer, 1875) - Colombia
 Neischnocolus panamanus Petrunkevitch, 1925 (type) - Panama
 Neischnocolus pijaos (Jimenez & Bertani, 2008) - Colombia
 Neischnocolus valentinae (Almeida, Salvatierra & de Morais, 2019) - Brazil
 Neischnocolus weinmanni (Pérez-Miles, 2008) - Venezuela 
 Neischnocolus yupanquii (Pérez-Miles, Gabriel & Gallon, 2008) - Ecuador

Neoheterophrictus

Neoheterophrictus Siliwal & Raven, 2012
 Neoheterophrictus amboli Mirza & Sanap, 2014 - India
 Neoheterophrictus bhori (Gravely, 1915) - India
 Neoheterophrictus chimminiensis Sunil Jose, 2020 - India
 Neoheterophrictus crurofulvus Siliwal, Gupta & Raven, 2012 (type) - India
 Neoheterophrictus madraspatanus (Gravely, 1935) - India
 Neoheterophrictus sahyadri Siliwal, Gupta & Raven, 2012 - India
 Neoheterophrictus smithi Mirza, Bhosale & Sanap, 2014 - India
 Neoheterophrictus uttarakannada Siliwal, Gupta & Raven, 2012 - India

Neoholothele

Neoholothele Guadanucci & Weinmann, 2015
 Neoholothele fasciaaurinigra Guadanucci & Weinmann, 2015 - Colombia
 Neoholothele incei (F. O. Pickard-Cambridge, 1899) (type) - Trinidad and Tobago, Venezuela

Neostenotarsus

Neostenotarsus Pribik & Weinmann, 2004
 Neostenotarsus guianensis (Caporiacco, 1954) - French Guiana

Nesiergus

Nesiergus Simon, 1903
 Nesiergus gardineri (Hirst, 1911) - Seychelles
 Nesiergus halophilus Benoit, 1978 - Seychelles
 Nesiergus insulanus Simon, 1903 (type) - Seychelles

Nesipelma

Nesipelma Schmidt & Kovařík, 1996
 Nesipelma insulare Schmidt & Kovařík, 1996 (type) - St. Kitts and Nevis (Nevis)
 Nesipelma medium (Chamberlin, 1917)

Nhandu

Nhandu Lucas, 1983
 Nhandu carapoensis Lucas, 1983 (type) - Brazil, Paraguay
 Nhandu cerradensis Bertani, 2001 - Brazil
 Nhandu chromatus Schmidt, 2004 - Brazil
 Nhandu coloratovillosus (Schmidt, 1998) - Brazil
 Nhandu tripepii (Dresco, 1984) - Brazil

O

Omothymus

Omothymus Thorell, 1891
 Omothymus fuchsi (Strand, 1906) - Indonesia (Sumatra)
 Omothymus rafni Gabriel & Sherwood, 2019 - Indonesia (Sumatra)
 Omothymus schioedtei Thorell, 1891 (type) - Malaysia
 Omothymus violaceopes (Abraham, 1924) - Malaysia, Singapore

Ornithoctonus

Ornithoctonus Pocock, 1892
 Ornithoctonus andersoni Pocock, 1892 (type) - Myanmar
 Ornithoctonus aureotibialis von Wirth & Striffler, 2005 - Thailand
 Ornithoctonus costalis (Schmidt, 1998) - Thailand

Orphnaecus

Orphnaecus Simon, 1892
 Orphnaecus adamsoni Salamanes, Santos, Austria & Villancio, 2022 - Philippines 
 Orphnaecus dichromatus (Schmidt & von Wirth, 1992) - New Guinea
 Orphnaecus kwebaburdeos (Barrion-Dupo, Barrion & Rasalan, 2015) - Philippines
 Orphnaecus pellitus Simon, 1892 (type) - Philippines
 Orphnaecus philippinus (Schmidt, 1999) - Philippines

Ozopactus

Ozopactus Simon, 1889
 Ozopactus ernsti Simon, 1889 (type) - Venezuela

P

Pachistopelma

Pachistopelma Pocock, 1901
 Pachistopelma bromelicola Bertani, 2012 - Brazil
 Pachistopelma rufonigrum Pocock, 1901 (type) - Brazil

Pamphobeteus

Pamphobeteus Pocock, 1901
 Pamphobeteus antinous Pocock, 1903 - Peru, Bolivia
 Pamphobeteus augusti (Simon, 1889) - Ecuador
 Pamphobeteus crassifemur Bertani, Fukushima & Silva, 2008 - Brazil
 Pamphobeteus ferox (Ausserer, 1875) - Colombia
 Pamphobeteus fortis (Ausserer, 1875) - Colombia
 Pamphobeteus grandis Bertani, Fukushima & Silva, 2008 - Brazil
 Pamphobeteus insignis Pocock, 1903 - Colombia
 Pamphobeteus nigricolor (Ausserer, 1875) (type) - Colombia, Brazil
 Pamphobeteus ornatus Pocock, 1903 - Panama, Colombia
 Pamphobeteus petersi Schmidt, 2002 - Ecuador, Peru
 Pamphobeteus sucreorum Gabriel & Sherwood, 2022 - Panama
 Pamphobeteus ultramarinus Schmidt, 1995 - Ecuador
 Pamphobeteus verdolaga Cifuentes, Perafán & Estrada-Gomez, 2016 - Colombia
 Pamphobeteus vespertinus (Simon, 1889) - Ecuador

Pelinobius

Pelinobius Karsch, 1885
 Pelinobius muticus Karsch, 1885 (type) - Kenya, Tanzania

Phlogiellus

Phlogiellus Pocock, 1897
 Phlogiellus aper (Simon, 1891) - Indonesia (Java)
 Phlogiellus atriceps Pocock, 1897 (type) - Indonesia (Java)
 Phlogiellus baeri (Simon, 1877) - Philippines
 Phlogiellus bicolor Strand, 1911 - Papua New Guinea (New Britain)
 Phlogiellus bogadeki Nunn, West & von Wirth, 2016 - China (Hong Kong)
 Phlogiellus brevipes (Thorell, 1897) - Myanmar
 Phlogiellus bundokalbo (Barrion & Litsinger, 1995) - Philippines
 Phlogiellus daweiensis Sivayyapram & Warrit, 2020 - Myanmar
 Phlogiellus inermis (Ausserer, 1871) - Malaysia to Indonesia (Lombok)
 Phlogiellus insulanus (Hirst, 1909) - Indonesia (Sulawesi)
 Phlogiellus insulanus borneoensis (Schmidt, 2015) - Borneo
 Phlogiellus insularis (Simon, 1877) - Philippines
 Phlogiellus jiaxiangi Lin & Li, 2021 - China
 Phlogiellus johnreylazoi Nunn, West & von Wirth, 2016 - Philippines (Palawan Is.)
 Phlogiellus longipalpus Chomphuphuang, Smith, Wongvilas, Sivayyapram, Songsangchote & Warrit, 2017 - Thailand
 Phlogiellus moniqueverdezae Nunn, West & von Wirth, 2016 - Thailand
 Phlogiellus mutus (Giltay, 1935) - Philippines
 Phlogiellus nebulosus (Rainbow, 1899) - Solomon Is.
 Phlogiellus obscurus (Hirst, 1909) - Malaysia (Borneo)
 Phlogiellus ornatus (Thorell, 1897) - Myanmar
 Phlogiellus orophilus (Thorell, 1897) - Myanmar
 Phlogiellus pelidnus Nunn, West & von Wirth, 2016 - Malaysia (Borneo)
 Phlogiellus quanyui Lin, Li & Chen, 2021 - China (Hainan)
 Phlogiellus raveni Sivayyapram & Warrit, 2020 - Philippines (Cebu)
 Phlogiellus subinermis (Giltay, 1934) - Southeast Asia
 Phlogiellus watasei (Kishida, 1920) - Taiwan
 Phlogiellus xinping (Zhu & Zhang, 2008) - China

Phoneyusa

Phoneyusa Karsch, 1884
 Phoneyusa antilope (Simon, 1889) - Congo
 Phoneyusa belandana Karsch, 1884 (type) - Central African Rep.
 Phoneyusa bidentata Pocock, 1900 - West, Central Africa
 Phoneyusa bidentata ituriensis Laurent, 1946 - Congo
 Phoneyusa bouvieri Berland, 1917 - Madagascar
 Phoneyusa buettneri Karsch, 1886 - Gabon
 Phoneyusa chevalieri Simon, 1906 - West Africa
 Phoneyusa cultridens Berland, 1917 - Congo
 Phoneyusa gabonica (Simon, 1889) - Gabon
 Phoneyusa giltayi Laurent, 1946 - Congo
 Phoneyusa gracilipes (Simon, 1889) - Angola
 Phoneyusa lesserti Dresco, 1973 - Central African Rep.
 Phoneyusa manicata Simon, 1907 - São Tomé and Príncipe
 Phoneyusa principium Simon, 1907 - São Tomé and Príncipe
 Phoneyusa rutilata (Simon, 1907) - Guinea-Bissau
 Phoneyusa westi Smith, 1990 - Angola

Phormictopus

Phormictopus Pocock, 1901
 Phormictopus atrichomatus Schmidt, 1991 - probably Hispaniola
 Phormictopus auratus Ortiz & Bertani, 2005 - Cuba
 Phormictopus australis Mello-Leitão, 1941 - Argentina
 Phormictopus bistriatus Rudloff, 2008 - Cuba
 Phormictopus cancerides (Latreille, 1806) (type) - Caribbean to Brazil
 Phormictopus cautus (Ausserer, 1875) - Cuba
 Phormictopus cochleasvorax Rudloff, 2008 - Cuba
 Phormictopus cubensis Chamberlin, 1917 - Cuba
 Phormictopus fritzschei Rudloff, 2008 - Cuba
 Phormictopus jonai Rudloff, 2008 - Cuba
 Phormictopus melodermus Chamberlin, 1917 - Hispaniola
 Phormictopus platus Chamberlin, 1917 - USA or Hispaniola
 Phormictopus ribeiroi Mello-Leitão, 1923 - Brazil
 Phormictopus schepanskii Rudloff, 2008 - Cuba

Phormingochilus

Phormingochilus Pocock, 1895
 
 Phormingochilus arboricola (Schmidt & Barensteiner, 2015) – Borneo
Phormingochilus everetti Pocock, 1895 (type) – Borneo
Phormingochilus pennellhewlettorum Smith & Jacobi, 2015 – Malaysia (Borneo)
Phormingochilus tigrinus Pocock, 1895 – Borneo

Phrixotrichus

Phrixotrichus Simon, 1889
 Phrixotrichus jara Perafán & Pérez-Miles, 2014 - Chile
 Phrixotrichus pucara Ferretti, 2015 - Argentina
 Phrixotrichus scrofa (Molina, 1782) - Chile, Argentina
 Phrixotrichus vulpinus (Karsch, 1880) (type) - Chile, Argentina

Plesiopelma

Plesiopelma Pocock, 1901
 Plesiopelma aspidosperma Ferretti & Barneche, 2013 - Argentina
 Plesiopelma gertschi (Caporiacco, 1955) - Venezuela
 Plesiopelma imperatrix Piza, 1976 - Brazil
 Plesiopelma insulare (Mello-Leitão, 1923) - Brazil
 Plesiopelma longisternale (Schiapelli & Gerschman, 1942) - Argentina, Uruguay
 Plesiopelma minense (Mello-Leitão, 1943) - Brazil
 Plesiopelma myodes Pocock, 1901 (type) - Uruguay
 Plesiopelma paganoi Ferretti & Barneche, 2013 - Argentina
 Plesiopelma physopus (Mello-Leitão, 1926) - Brazil
 Plesiopelma rectimanum (Mello-Leitão, 1923) - Brazil
 Plesiopelma semiaurantiacum (Simon, 1897) - Paraguay, Uruguay

Plesiophrictus

Plesiophrictus Pocock, 1899
 Plesiophrictus fabrei (Simon, 1892) - India
 Plesiophrictus linteatus (Simon, 1891) - India
 Plesiophrictus meghalayaensis Tikader, 1977 - India
 Plesiophrictus millardi Pocock, 1899 (type) - India
 Plesiophrictus nilagiriensis Siliwal, Molur & Raven, 2007 - India
 Plesiophrictus senffti (Strand, 1907) - Micronesia
 Plesiophrictus sericeus Pocock, 1900 - India
 Plesiophrictus tenuipes Pocock, 1899 - Sri Lanka

Poecilotheria

Poecilotheria Simon, 1885
 Poecilotheria fasciata (Latreille, 1804) (type) - Sri Lanka
 Poecilotheria formosa Pocock, 1899 - India
 Poecilotheria hanumavilasumica Smith, 2004 - India, Sri Lanka
 Poecilotheria metallica Pocock, 1899 - India
 Poecilotheria miranda Pocock, 1900 - India
 Poecilotheria ornata Pocock, 1899 - Sri Lanka
 Poecilotheria rajaei Nanayakkara, Kirk, Dayananda, Ganehiarachchi, Vishvanath & Kusuminda, 2012 - Sri Lanka
 Poecilotheria regalis Pocock, 1899 - India
 Poecilotheria rufilata Pocock, 1899 - India
 Poecilotheria smithi Kirk, 1996 - Sri Lanka
 Poecilotheria srilankensis Nanayakkara, Ganehiarachi, Kusuminda, Vishvanath, Karunaratne & Kirk, 2020 - Sri Lanka
 Poecilotheria striata Pocock, 1895 - India
 Poecilotheria subfusca Pocock, 1895 - Sri Lanka
 Poecilotheria tigrinawesseli Smith, 2006 - India
 Poecilotheria vittata Pocock, 1895 - India, Sri Lanka

Proshapalopus

Proshapalopus Mello-Leitão, 1923
 Proshapalopus amazonicus Bertani, 2001 - Brazil
 Proshapalopus anomalus Mello-Leitão, 1923 (type) - Brazil
 Proshapalopus multicuspidatus (Mello-Leitão, 1929) - Brazil

Psalistops 
Psalistops Simon, 1889
 
 Psalistops colombianus Mori & Bertani, 2020 - Colombia
 Psalistops melanopygius Simon, 1889 (type) - Venezuela

Psalmopoeus

Psalmopoeus Pocock, 1895
 Psalmopoeus cambridgei Pocock, 1895 (type) - Trinidad, possibly Malaysia
 Psalmopoeus ecclesiasticus Pocock, 1903 - Ecuador
 Psalmopoeus emeraldus Pocock, 1903 - Colombia
 Psalmopoeus irminia Saager, 1994 - Venezuela, Guyana, Brazil
 Psalmopoeus langenbucheri Schmidt, Bullmer & Thierer-Lutz, 2006 - Venezuela
 Psalmopoeus maya Witt, 1996 - Belize
 Psalmopoeus plantaris Pocock, 1903 - Colombia
 Psalmopoeus pulcher Petrunkevitch, 1925 - Panama
 Psalmopoeus reduncus (Karsch, 1880) - Belize to Panama
 Psalmopoeus victori Mendoza, 2014 - Mexico

Psednocnemis

Psednocnemis West, Nunn & Hogg, 2012
 Psednocnemis brachyramosa (West & Nunn, 2010) - Malaysia
 Psednocnemis davidgohi West, Nunn & Hogg, 2012 (type) - Malaysia
 Psednocnemis gnathospina (West & Nunn, 2010) - Malaysia
 Psednocnemis imbellis (Simon, 1891) - Borneo
 Psednocnemis jeremyhuffi (West & Nunn, 2010) - Malaysia

Pseudhapalopus

Pseudhapalopus Strand, 1907
 Pseudhapalopus aculeatus Strand, 1907 (type) - Bolivia

Pseudoschizopelma 
Pseudoschizopelma Smith, 1995
 
 Pseudoschizopelma macropus (Ausserer, 1875) (type) - Mexico

Pterinochilus

Pterinochilus Pocock, 1897
 Pterinochilus alluaudi Berland, 1914 - Kenya
 Pterinochilus andrewsmithi Gallon, 2009 - Kenya
 Pterinochilus chordatus (Gerstäcker, 1873) - East Africa
 Pterinochilus cryptus Gallon, 2008 - Angola
 Pterinochilus lapalala Gallon & Engelbrecht, 2011 - South Africa
 Pterinochilus lugardi Pocock, 1900 - Southern, East Africa
 Pterinochilus murinus Pocock, 1897 - Angola, Central, East, Southern Africa
 Pterinochilus raygabrieli Gallon, 2009 - Kenya
 Pterinochilus simoni Berland, 1917 - Angola, Congo
 Pterinochilus vorax Pocock, 1897 (type) - Angola, Central, East Africa

Pterinopelma

Pterinopelma Pocock, 1901
 Pterinopelma felipeleitei Bertani & Leal, 2016 - Brazil
 Pterinopelma sazimai Bertani, Nagahama & Fukushima, 2011 - Brazil
 Pterinopelma vitiosum (Keyserling, 1891) (type) - Brazil

R

Reichlingia

Reichlingia Rudloff, 2001
 Reichlingia annae (Reichling, 1997) (type) - Belize

Reversopelma

Reversopelma Schmidt, 2001
 Reversopelma petersi Schmidt, 2001 (type) - Ecuador or Peru

S

Sahydroaraneus

Sahydroaraneus Mirza & Sanap, 2014
 Sahydroaraneus collinus (Pocock, 1899) - India
 Sahydroaraneus hirsti Mirza & Sanap, 2014 (type) - India
 Sahydroaraneus raja (Gravely, 1915) - India
 Sahydroaraneus sebastiani Sunil Jose, 2017 - India

Sandinista 
Sandinista Longhorn & Gabriel, 2019
 
 Sandinista lanceolatum (Simon, 1891) (type) - Nicaragua, Costa Rica

Schismatothele

Schismatothele Karsch, 1879
 Schismatothele benedettii Panzera, Perdomo & Pérez-Miles, 2011 - Brazil
 Schismatothele hacaritama Perafán, Valencia-Cuéllar & Guadanucci, 2019 - Colombia
 Schismatothele inflata (Simon, 1889) (type) - Venezuela
 Schismatothele kastoni (Caporiacco, 1955) - Venezuela
 Schismatothele lineata Karsch, 1879 - Venezuela
 Schismatothele modesta (Simon, 1889) - Colombia
 Schismatothele olsoni Guadanucci, Perafán & Valencia-Cuéllar, 2019 - Colombia, Venezuela
 Schismatothele opifex (Simon, 1889) - Venezuela
 Schismatothele weinmanni Guadanucci, Perafán & Valencia-Cuéllar, 2019 - Colombia

Schizopelma

Schizopelma F. O. Pickard-Cambridge, 1897
 Schizopelma bicarinatum F. O. Pickard-Cambridge, 1897 (type) - Mexico, Central America
 Schizopelma juxtantricola (Ortiz & Francke, 2015) - Mexico

Scopelobates

Scopelobates Simon, 1903
 Scopelobates sericeus Simon, 1903 (type) - Dominican Republic

Selenocosmia

Selenocosmia Ausserer, 1871
 Selenocosmia anubis Yu, S. Y. Zhang, F. Zhang, Li & Yang, 2021 - China
 Selenocosmia arndsti (Schmidt & von Wirth, 1991) - New Guinea
 Selenocosmia aruana Strand, 1911 - Indonesia (Aru Is.)
 Selenocosmia barensteinerae (Schmidt, Hettegger & Matthes, 2010) - Borneo
 Selenocosmia compta Kulczyński, 1911 - New Guinea
 Selenocosmia crassipes (L. Koch, 1874) - Australia (Queensland)
 Selenocosmia deliana Strand, 1913 - Indonesia (Sumatra)
 Selenocosmia effera (Simon, 1891) - Indonesia (Moluccas)
 Selenocosmia fuliginea (Thorell, 1895) - Myanmar
 Selenocosmia hasselti Simon, 1891 - Indonesia (Sumatra)
 Selenocosmia hirtipes Strand, 1913 - Indonesia (Moluccas), New Guinea
 Selenocosmia honesta Hirst, 1909 - New Guinea
 Selenocosmia insignis (Simon, 1890) - Indonesia (Sumatra)
 Selenocosmia javanensis (Walckenaer, 1837) (type) - Malaysia to Indonesia (Sulawesi)
 Selenocosmia javanensis brachyplectra Kulczyński, 1908 - Indonesia (Java)
 Selenocosmia javanensis dolichoplectra Kulczyński, 1908 - Indonesia (Java)
 Selenocosmia javanensis fulva Kulczyński, 1908 - Indonesia (Java)
 Selenocosmia javanensis sumatrana Thorell, 1890 - Indonesia (Sumatra)
 Selenocosmia jiafu Zhu & Zhang, 2008 - China, Laos
 Selenocosmia kovariki (Schmidt & Krause, 1995) - Vietnam
 Selenocosmia kulluensis Chamberlin, 1917 - India
 Selenocosmia lanceolata Hogg, 1914 - New Guinea
 Selenocosmia lanipes Ausserer, 1875 - Indonesia (Moluccas), New Guinea
 Selenocosmia longiembola Yu, S. Y. Zhang, F. Zhang, Li & Yang, 2021 - China
 Selenocosmia mittmannae (Barensteiner & Wehinger, 2005) - New Guinea
 Selenocosmia papuana Kulczyński, 1908 - New Guinea
 Selenocosmia peerboomi (Schmidt, 1999) - Philippines
 Selenocosmia pritami Dyal, 1935 - Pakistan
 Selenocosmia qiani Yu, S. Y. Zhang, F. Zhang, Li & Yang, 2021 - China
 Selenocosmia raciborskii Kulczyński, 1908 - Indonesia (Java)
 Selenocosmia samarae (Giltay, 1935) - Philippines
 Selenocosmia similis Kulczyński, 1911 - New Guinea
 Selenocosmia stirlingi Hogg, 1901 - Australia
 Selenocosmia strenua (Thorell, 1881) - New Guinea, Australia (Queensland)
 Selenocosmia strubelli Strand, 1913 - Indonesia (Java, Moluccas) or New Guinea
 Selenocosmia sutherlandi Gravely, 1935 - India
 Selenocosmia tahanensis Abraham, 1924 - Malaysia
 Selenocosmia valida (Thorell, 1881) - New Guinea
 Selenocosmia xinhuaensis Zhu & Zhang, 2008 - China
 Selenocosmia zhangzhengi Lin, 2022 - China

Selenogyrus

Selenogyrus Pocock, 1897
 Selenogyrus africanus (Simon, 1887) - Ivory Coast
 Selenogyrus aureus Pocock, 1897 - Sierra Leone
 Selenogyrus austini Smith, 1990 - Sierra Leone
 Selenogyrus caeruleus Pocock, 1897 (type) - Sierra Leone

Selenotholus

Selenotholus Hogg, 1902
 Selenotholus foelschei Hogg, 1902 (type) - Australia (Northern Territory)

Selenotypus

Selenotypus Pocock, 1895
 Selenotypus plumipes Pocock, 1895 (type) - Australia (Queensland)

Sericopelma

Sericopelma Ausserer, 1875
 Sericopelma angustum (Valerio, 1980) - Costa Rica
 Sericopelma commune F. O. Pickard-Cambridge, 1897 - Panama
 Sericopelma dota Valerio, 1980 - Costa Rica
 Sericopelma embrithes (Chamberlin & Ivie, 1936) - Panama
 Sericopelma fallax Mello-Leitão, 1923 - Brazil
 Sericopelma ferrugineum Valerio, 1980 - Costa Rica
 Sericopelma generala Valerio, 1980 - Costa Rica
 Sericopelma immensum Valerio, 1980 - Costa Rica
 Sericopelma melanotarsum Valerio, 1980 - Costa Rica
 Sericopelma panamanum (Karsch, 1880) - Panama
 Sericopelma panamense (Simon, 1891) - Mexico, Panama
 Sericopelma rubronitens Ausserer, 1875 (type) - Central America
 Sericopelma silvicola Valerio, 1980 - Costa Rica
 Sericopelma upala Valerio, 1980 - Costa Rica

Sickius

Sickius Soares & Camargo, 1948
 Sickius longibulbi Soares & Camargo, 1948 (type) - Brazil

Sphaerobothria

Sphaerobothria Karsch, 1879
 Sphaerobothria hoffmanni Karsch, 1879 (type) - Costa Rica, Panama

Spinosatibiapalpus 
Spinosatibiapalpus Gabriel & Sherwood, 2020
 
 Spinosatibiapalpus bora Sherwood & Gabriel, 2021 - Peru
 Spinosatibiapalpus cambrai Gabriel & Sherwood, 2022 - Panama 
 Spinosatibiapalpus spinulopalpus (Schmidt & Weinmann, 1997) - Colombia
 Spinosatibiapalpus tansleyi Gabriel & Sherwood, 2020 - Trinidad 
 Spinosatibiapalpus trinitatis (Pocock, 1903) (type) - Trinidad

Stichoplastoris

Stichoplastoris Rudloff, 1997
 Stichoplastoris angustatus (Kraus, 1955) - El Salvador
 Stichoplastoris asterix (Valerio, 1980) - Costa Rica
 Stichoplastoris denticulatus (Valerio, 1980) - Costa Rica
 Stichoplastoris elusinus (Valerio, 1980) - Costa Rica
 Stichoplastoris longistylus (Kraus, 1955) - El Salvador
 Stichoplastoris obelix (Valerio, 1980) (type) - Costa Rica
 Stichoplastoris schusterae (Kraus, 1955) - El Salvador
 Stichoplastoris stylipus (Valerio, 1982) - Costa Rica, Panama

Stromatopelma

Stromatopelma Karsch, 1881
 Stromatopelma batesi (Pocock, 1902) - Cameroon, Congo
 Stromatopelma calceatum (Fabricius, 1793) (type) - West Africa
 Stromatopelma calceatum griseipes (Pocock, 1897) - West Africa
 Stromatopelma fumigatum (Pocock, 1900) - Equatorial Guinea (Mbini)
 Stromatopelma pachypoda (Strand, 1908) - Cameroon
 Stromatopelma satanas (Berland, 1917) - Gabon, Congo

T

Taksinus 
Taksinus Songsangchote, Sippawat, Khaikaew & Chomphuphuang, 2022
 
 Taksinus bambus Songsangchote, Sippawat, Khaikaew & Chomphuphuang, 2022 (type) - Thailand

Tapinauchenius

Tapinauchenius Ausserer, 1871
 Tapinauchenius brunneus Schmidt, 1995 - Brazil
 Tapinauchenius cupreus Schmidt & Bauer, 1996 - Ecuador
 Tapinauchenius gretae Cifuentes & Bertani, 2022 - Brazil
 Tapinauchenius herrerai Gabriel & Sherwood, 2022 - Panama
 Tapinauchenius latipes L. Koch, 1875 - Venezuela
 Tapinauchenius plumipes (C. L. Koch, 1842) (type) - Suriname
 Tapinauchenius polybotes Hüsser, 2018 - Lesser Antilles (St. Lucia)
 Tapinauchenius rasti Hüsser, 2018 - Lesser Antilles (St. Vincent and the Grenadines)
 Tapinauchenius sanctivincenti (Walckenaer, 1837) - St. Vincent
 Tapinauchenius violaceus (Mello-Leitão, 1930) - French Guiana, Brazil

Theraphosa

Theraphosa Thorell, 1870
 Theraphosa apophysis (Tinter, 1991) - Colombia, Venezuela, Brazil
 Theraphosa blondi (Latreille, 1804) (type) - Venezuela, Brazil, Guyana
 Theraphosa stirmi Rudloff & Weinmann, 2010 - Guyana, Brazil

Thrigmopoeus

Thrigmopoeus Pocock, 1899
 Thrigmopoeus insignis Pocock, 1899 (type) - India
 Thrigmopoeus truculentus Pocock, 1899 - India

Thrixopelma

Thrixopelma Schmidt, 1994
 Thrixopelma aymara (Chamberlin, 1916) - Peru
 Thrixopelma cyaneolum Schmidt, Friebolin & Friebolin, 2005 - Peru
 Thrixopelma lagunas Schmidt & Rudloff, 2010 - Peru
 Thrixopelma longicolli (Schmidt, 2003) - Ecuador, Peru
 Thrixopelma nadineae Sherwood & Gabriel, 2022 - Ecuador
 Thrixopelma ockerti Schmidt, 1994 (type) - Peru
 Thrixopelma peruvianum (Schmidt, 2007) - Peru
 Thrixopelma pruriens Schmidt, 1998 - Chile

Tliltocatl

Tliltocatl Jorge & Oscar, 2019
 Tliltocatl albopilosum Valerio, 1980 - Costa Rica
 Tliltocatl epicureanum (Chamberlin, 1925) - Mexico
 Tliltocatl kahlenbergi Rudloff, 2008 - Mexico
 Tliltocatl sabulosum (F. O. Pickard-Cambridge, 1897) - Guatemala
 Tliltocatl schroederi Rudloff, 2003 - Mexico
 Tliltocatl vagans (Ausserer, 1875) - Mexico, Central America
 Tliltocatl verdezi Schmidt, 2003 - Mexico

Tmesiphantes

Tmesiphantes Simon, 1892
 Tmesiphantes amadoi Yamamoto, Lucas, Guadanucci & Indicatti, 2007 - Brazil
 Tmesiphantes amazonicus Fabiano-da-Silva, Guadanucci & DaSilva, 2019 - Brazil
 Tmesiphantes aridai Gonzalez-Filho, Brescovit & Lucas, 2014 - Brazil
 Tmesiphantes bethaniae Yamamoto, Lucas, Guadanucci & Indicatti, 2007 - Brazil
 Tmesiphantes brescoviti (Indicatti, Lucas, Guadanucci & Yamamoto, 2008) - Brazil
 Tmesiphantes buecherli (Indicatti, Lucas, Guadanucci & Yamamoto, 2008) - Brazil
 Tmesiphantes caymmii Yamamoto, Lucas, Guadanucci & Indicatti, 2007 - Brazil
 Tmesiphantes crassifemur (Gerschman & Schiapelli, 1960) - Argentina
 Tmesiphantes guayarus Fabiano-da-Silva, Guadanucci & DaSilva, 2019 - Brazil
 Tmesiphantes hypogeus Bertani, Bichuette & Pedroso, 2013 - Brazil
 Tmesiphantes intiyaykuy Nicoletta, Ferretti, Chaparro & West, 2022 - Peru
 Tmesiphantes janeira (Keyserling, 1891) - Peru
 Tmesiphantes mirim Fabiano-da-Silva, Guadanucci & DaSilva, 2015 - Brazil
 Tmesiphantes mutquina (Perafán & Pérez-Miles, 2014) - Argentina
 Tmesiphantes nordestinus Fabiano-da-Silva, Guadanucci & DaSilva, 2019 - Brazil
 Tmesiphantes nubilus Simon, 1892 (type) - Brazil
 Tmesiphantes obesus (Simon, 1892) - Brazil
 Tmesiphantes perp Guadanucci & Silva, 2012 - Brazil
 Tmesiphantes raulseixasi Fabiano-da-Silva, Guadanucci & DaSilva, 2019 - Brazil
 Tmesiphantes riopretano Guadanucci & Silva, 2012 - Brazil
 Tmesiphantes uru (Perafán & Pérez-Miles, 2014) - Argentina
 Tmesiphantes yupanqui (Perafán & Pérez-Miles, 2014) - Argentina

Trichognathella

Trichognathella Gallon, 2004
 Trichognathella schoenlandi (Pocock, 1900) (type) - South Africa

Trichopelma

Trichopelma Simon, 1888
 Trichopelma affine (Simon, 1892) - St. Vincent
 Trichopelma banksia Özdikmen & Demir, 2012 - Cuba
 Trichopelma bimini Mori & Bertani, 2020 - Bahamas
 Trichopelma coenobita (Simon, 1889) - Venezuela
 Trichopelma cubanum (Simon, 1903) - Cuba
 Trichopelma fulvum (Bryant, 1948) - Haiti
 Trichopelma gabrieli Mori & Bertani, 2020 - Dominican Republic
 Trichopelma goloboffi Mori & Bertani, 2020 - Cuba
 Trichopelma huffi Mori & Bertani, 2020 - Dominican Republic
 Trichopelma illetabile Simon, 1888 - Brazil
 Trichopelma insulanum (Petrunkevitch, 1926) - St. Thomas
 Trichopelma juventud Mori & Bertani, 2020 - Cuba
 Trichopelma laselva Valerio, 1986 - Costa Rica
 Trichopelma laurae Mori & Bertani, 2020 - Cuba
 Trichopelma loui Mori & Bertani, 2020 - Jamaica 
 Trichopelma maculatum (Banks, 1906) - Bahama Is.
 Trichopelma nitidum Simon, 1888 (type) - Hispaniola
 Trichopelma platnicki Mori & Bertani, 2020 - Jamaica 
 Trichopelma steini (Simon, 1889) - Venezuela
 Trichopelma tostoi Mori & Bertani, 2020 - Dominican Republic
 Trichopelma venadense (Valerio, 1986) - Costa Rica
 Trichopelma zebra (Petrunkevitch, 1925) - Panama

Typhochlaena

Typhochlaena C. L. Koch, 1850
 Typhochlaena amma Bertani, 2012 - Brazil
 Typhochlaena costae Bertani, 2012 - Brazil
 Typhochlaena curumim Bertani, 2012 - Brazil
 Typhochlaena paschoali Bertani, 2012 - Brazil
 Typhochlaena seladonia (C. L. Koch, 1841) (type) - Brazil

U

Umbyquyra

Umbyquyra Gargiulo, Brescovit & Lucas, 2018
 Umbyquyra acuminata (Schmidt & Tesmoingt, 2005) - Bolivia, Brazil
 Umbyquyra araguaia Gargiulo, Brescovit & Lucas, 2018 - Brazil
 Umbyquyra belterra Gargiulo, Brescovit & Lucas, 2018 - Brazil
 Umbyquyra caxiuana Gargiulo, Brescovit & Lucas, 2018 - Brazil
 Umbyquyra cuiaba Gargiulo, Brescovit & Lucas, 2018 - Brazil
 Umbyquyra gurleyi Sherwood & Gabriel, 2020 - Brazil
 Umbyquyra palmarum (Schiapelli & Gerschman, 1945) - Brazil
 Umbyquyra paranaiba Gargiulo, Brescovit & Lucas, 2018 (type) - Brazil
 Umbyquyra sapezal Gargiulo, Brescovit & Lucas, 2018 - Brazil
 Umbyquyra schmidti (Rudloff, 1996) - Brazil
 Umbyquyra tapajos Gargiulo, Brescovit & Lucas, 2018 - Brazil
 Umbyquyra tucurui Gargiulo, Brescovit & Lucas, 2018 - Brazil

V

Vitalius

Vitalius Lucas, Silva & Bertani, 1993
 Vitalius buecherli Bertani, 2001 - Brazil
 Vitalius dubius (Mello-Leitão, 1923) - Brazil
 Vitalius longisternalis Bertani, 2001 - Brazil, Argentina
 Vitalius lucasae Bertani, 2001 - Brazil
 Vitalius nondescriptus (Mello-Leitão, 1926) - Brazil
 Vitalius paranaensis Bertani, 2001 - Brazil, Argentina
 Vitalius roseus (Mello-Leitão, 1923) - Brazil, Argentina
 Vitalius sorocabae (Mello-Leitão, 1923) (type) - Brazil
 Vitalius vellutinus (Mello-Leitão, 1923) - Brazil
 Vitalius wacketi (Mello-Leitão, 1923) - Brazil

X

Xenesthis

Xenesthis Simon, 1891
 Xenesthis colombiana Simon, 1891 (type) - Colombia
 Xenesthis immanis (Ausserer, 1875) - Panama to Venezuela
 Xenesthis intermedia Schiapelli & Gerschman, 1945 - Venezuela
 Xenesthis monstrosa Pocock, 1903 - Colombia

Y

Yanomamius 
Yanomamius Bertani & Almeida, 2021
 
 Yanomamius franciscoi Bertani & Almeida, 2021 (type) - Brazil
 Yanomamius neblina Bertani & Almeida, 2021 - Brazil
 Yanomamius raonii Bertani & Almeida, 2021 - Brazil
 Yanomamius waikoshiemi (Bertani & Araújo, 2006) - Venezuela

Ybyrapora

Ybyrapora Fukushima & Bertani, 2017
 Ybyrapora diversipes (C. L. Koch, 1842) - Brazil
 Ybyrapora gamba (Bertani & Fukushima, 2009) - Brazil
 Ybyrapora sooretama (Bertani & Fukushima, 2009) (type) - Brazil

References

 

 

Theraphosidae
Theraphosidae